The Croatian Orthodox Church was a religious body created during World War II by the Fascist Ustaše regime in the Independent State of Croatia (NDH). It was created in order to assimilate the remaining Serb minority and also to unite other Orthodox communities into a state-based Orthodox Church.

In 1942, NDH authorities finally made a move to organize a domestic Orthodox Church. This was part of a policy to eliminate Serb culture from Axis Croatia. The church lasted from 1942–45, and was intended to serve as a national church to which Serbs living in Croatia would convert, thus making it possible to describe them as "Croats of Orthodox faith". The Croatian Orthodox Church was managed by Montenegrin nationalist Savić Marković Štedimlija. There were some discussions during the 1990s, after the breakup of Yugoslavia, regarding the revival of such a church.

History

The Croatian Orthodox Church was created due to the loss of a significant part of the territory to Partisans and Chetniks, as well as the additional German pressure over growing anarchy in the country caused by the persecution of Serbs, which is why a concession to the Serb population was deemed necessary.

The church was formed by a government statute (No. XC-800-Z-1942) on 4 April 1942. On 5 June, using a statute issued by the government, the church's constitution 
was passed. The church lasted until the collapse of the NDH. A small number of the Serb clergy joined it but the Serbian Church hierarchy along with ordinary Serbs rejected it. Many or most of the church's priests were Serbian priests compelled to change churches in order to survive, along with émigré priests from Russia.

On 7 June, White Russian émigré Germogen Maximov, a bishop of the Russian Orthodox Church Outside Russia, became its leader. His enthronement was publicized by the Ustashe regime and the official ceremony took place in front of an armed guard, with the speaker of the Croatian parliament, mayor of Zagreb and several ministers in attendance. He was executed by the Partisans after the war as a collaborator.

Before the Croatian Orthodox Church was formed, the NDH officially described the Eastern Orthodox Church as the "Greek-Eastern Church", and would refer to it as the "Schismatic Church" or the "Greek non-Uniate Church". It was not recognized by the Ecumenical Patriarch in Istanbul. The Church was only recognized by one other Orthodox church, the Romanian Orthodox Church, on 4 August 1944 (at the time, Romania was also under the control of the Fascist regime of Ion Antonescu).

According to historian Jozo Tomasevich, although the Church was established as a way to appease the remaining Serb Orthodox population in the NDH, it was ultimately a means to destroying religious, cultural and national ties between Serbs in Serbia and Serbs in the NDH because the Ustashe could not achieve their goal of exterminating the whole Serb population of Croatia. Persecution of Serbs persisted even after its establishment, though it was not as intense as before.

Proposals for a revival

On 6 March 1993, Juraj Kolarić, dean of the Catholic Faculty of Theology in Zagreb, was reported by the Tanjug news agency as stating that the "Orthodox Church in Croatia should be organized along the Macedonian principle, with its patriarch, and break away as far as territory was concerned, from Serbia”. Kolarić tried several times to establish such a church by the "Croat Orthodox believers and possible Croatian Orthodox clergy, because then all the conditions for an autocephalous church would be met". Kolarić claimed that if such a church were formed, it would eventually be recognized by the Patriarch of Constantinople as the Serbian Orthodox Church would never again be present in Croatia.

References

Sources

Further reading

External links
Savic Markovic Stedimlija - Ideologist of "Red Croatia", njegos.org; accessed 20 April 2015
New Attacks on the Serbian Orthodox Church, hri.org, 4 April 1996
The Orthodox Church in Croatia , Vreme News Digest Agency No 77, 15 March 1993

Ustaše
 
Independent State of Croatia
Eastern Orthodoxy and far-right politics